Cinco is a 2010 Filipino horror anthology film produced and released by Star Cinema. The film consists of five different horror stories which each featuring an ensemble cast including Sam Concepcion, AJ Perez, Robi Domingo, Jodi Sta. Maria, Maja Salvador, Rayver Cruz, Mariel Rodriguez, Pokwang and Zanjoe Marudo and are directed by Frasco Mortiz, Enrico C. Santos, Ato Bautista, Nick Olanka, and Cathy Garcia-Molina. The film was released on July 14, 2010.

Plot
The film is divided into five parts entitled "Braso", "Paa", "Mata", "Mukha" and "Puso".

Synopsis
The movie includes 5 stories which all revolve around a hand with an "R.I.P" tattoo.

One: Braso (Arm)
Three neophytes (Sam Concepcion, AJ Perez & Robi Domingo) are brought to a morgue while dressed in lingeries for the final part of their initiation to join a fraternity. After snooping around the place, the boys find a detached arm with an "R.I.P" tattoo of a corpse comes to life, much of their terror. The animated hand causes trouble to the group before they escape.

Two: Paa (Feet)
A young mother (Jodi Sta. Maria) visits the wake of her daughter's classmate. As she went to the wake, a rabid dog bit her. Soon after, she finds the ghost of the dead child on her tail, seeking revenge after she stole the shoes of her daughter's classmate (which caused the kid's amputated feet and death). She suffers hallucinations of the ghost kid. The mother then burns the shoes, ending the ghost's haunting. A year later, the mother is seen in crutches, her leg amputated.

Three: Mata (Eyes)
"Eyes" is all about Rose (Maja Salvador) who after witnessing a crime when her boyfriend (Rayver Cruz) kills a man during road rage, experiences multiple déjà vu of the same incident. To avoid her boyfriend killing the man, she finally shoots him instead, hitting his eye causing his death. Back in her home, she receives a call from her dead boyfriend who appears in front of her, seemingly killing her. The R.I.P. tattoo on the hand was shown lighting a man's cigarette in one of the scenes.

Four: Mukha (Face)
Rizza (Mariel Rodriguez) is an editor with a cold and heartless attitude. After she fires Mang Bong (Nanding Josef), the janitor, she is then haunted by ghastly figures. It is then revealed to be a prank by the late night shift employee Eric(Ketchup Eusebio). After Rizza finds out about this, she becomes infuriated. Eric then receives a call, telling him that Mang Bong died from suicide. Meanwhile, Rizza enters the elevator and angrily shouts "You're fired!" unaware that the real ghost is behind her inside the elevator. The episode ends with Eric finding her inside the elevator, traumatized by the ghost. She then suddenly becomes crazy. During Mang Bong's suicide, an employee that was waiting outside bought a balut which was handed to him by a man whose hand bears the R.I.P tattoo.

Five: Puso (Heart)
Emily, a circus woman (Pokwang) with an unflattering appearance uses a love potion on her love interest, Elvis (Zanjoe Marudo), who works in the carnival's horror house. When the potion worked, unfortunately, Elvis was brutally stabbed to death by a crazed member of the audience. Hell ensues at the carnival as Elvis returns undead and chases the circus Emily, killing all who tries to obstruct him, even his own girlfriend. After cutting off Elvis' arm, it comes back to life, causing Emily to have a heart attack and her death. It is revealed that the arm is the same arm in the first part of the movie "BRASO". It is also revealed that Elvis is the one with the R.I.P. tattoo on the arm.

Cast

One: Braso (Arm)
 Sam Concepcion as Ivan
 AJ Perez† as Andrew
 Robi Domingo as Ronald
 Baron Geisler as Greg
 Kristel Moreno as Trisha
 Fred Payawan as Frat Member
 Jommy Teotico as Frat Member

Two: Paa (Feet)
 Jodi Sta. Maria as Elisa
 Barbie Sabino as Ana
 Gianna Cutler as Kaye
 Joy Viado† as Aling Gloria
 Shamaine Buencamino as Kaye's mother

Three: Mata (Eyes)
 Maja Salvador as Rose
 Rayver Cruz as Alvin
 Mark Manicad as Jerome
 David Chua as Road Rage Victim

Four: Mukha (Face)
 Mariel Rodriguez as Rizza
 Ketchup Eusebio as Eric  
 Nanding Josef as Mang Bong
 Arnold Reyes as Raymond

Five: Puso (Heart)
 Pokwang as Emily
 Zanjoe Marudo as Elvis
 Bangs Garcia as Rowena
 Empoy Marquez as Denden
 Malou de Guzman as Madam Osang
 Robin Lavarquez as Elvis' Double

Reception
Cinco debuted with a ₱11 million gross on its first day nationwide. The film gave a total gross of ₱61 million, according to Box Office Mojo.

See also
 List of ghost films

References

External links
 
 Cinco's Official Multiply Website
 Star Cinema Multiply Website
 

2010 films
2010 horror films
Films directed by Cathy Garcia-Molina
Philippine supernatural horror films
Philippine thriller drama films
Philippine comedy horror films
Philippine psychological thriller films
Philippine psychological horror films
Zombie comedy films
2010s Tagalog-language films
2010s English-language films
Star Cinema films
2010 multilingual films
Philippine multilingual films